Dumanjug, officially the Municipality of Dumanjug,  is a 3rd class municipality in the province of Cebu, Philippines. According to the 2020 census, it has a population of 57,823 people.

It was established in 1855. Based on the cadastral survey map of the Department of Environment and Natural Resources (DENR), Dumanjug has an effective land area of 

Dumanjug is bordered to the north by the town of Barili, to the west is the Tañon Strait, to the east is the town of Sibonga, and to the south is the town of Ronda.

Dumanjug is also known as "The Land of Golden Friendship".

Geography

Barangays
Dumanjug comprises 37 barangays:

Climate

Demographics

Dumanjug's population is characterized mainly by an increasing birth rate and a gradually declining mortality rate. The growth in population is thus attributed to higher rate of birth than of death.

The bulk of the household population is concentrated in the coastal barangays located in the western part of the municipality. The urban area comprising Poblacion, Sima, Ilaya, and Looc has the biggest slice of the population. Barangays Bitoon, Tangil, Tapon, Balaygtiki, Cogon and Liong are catching up with the urban barangays in terms of household population. With the urban area fast becoming a commercial hub, Bitoon, Paculob, Cogon and Liong are foreseen as upcoming dormitory communities.

Dumanjuganons speak Cebuano, the official language spoken in Cebu. Cebuano is also spoken in most areas of the Visayas and in many provinces of Mindanao.

Religion

The people of Dumanjug are mostly Catholics. The town has three Catholic parishes:
St. Francis of Assisi church (Poblacion)
St. Vincent Ferrer (Bitoon)
Our Lady of the Holy Rosary (Bulak)

Economy

Majority of the existing industrial establishments in Dumanjug are those of micro-scale industries or establishments. These include bakeshops, welding shops, and cottage industries. Their products are mostly bakery products, assembled vehicles and handicrafts. Most of these establishments are found in the poblacion area and Bitoon. There are also four existing rice and corn mills operating in the municipality.

The municipality has considerable quantities of high-grade dolomites and large phosphate reserves found in Kanghumaod, Balaygtiki, Bullogan, Kabalaasnan, Matalao and Kabatbatan.

The Dumanjug Agora Complex is the center of trade & commerce of the municipality. Within the complex, various commercial establishments contribute greatly to the movement of goods and generation of revenues. These establishments cover basic goods for daily needs to construction supplies, agri-feeds, dry goods and many more. Sunday is designated as market day when various livestock and farm products congregate in the market. Out of town traders create an atmosphere of competition and creating opportunities for local consumers. Opposite the Agora complex is Gaisano Grand Mall, the first mall to be constructed in southwestern Cebu.

Tourism
Pityak / Tubod-Duguan Falls
Windy Peak Campsite and Cotcoton Loranisa Farm
SaDumanjugNi Ancestral House
St. Francis de Assisi Parish Church - one of the oldest church in the Philippines
Bisnok Festival
Camboang Marin Sanctuary
Cantarini Art Gallery
Dona Josefa Paras Garcia Heritage Park
Falls of Lelo-an and rock formations
Julian Macoy photo gallery
Kota Kanwa Beach
La Montera Beach Resort
Monkey Watching at Brangay Kabala-asnan - natural habitat
The Seaplane
Tangil Wharf
Nanay Inie Beach (Sitio Bangag, Tangil)

Transportation

Dumanjug is currently served by eight bus operators
 Britt
 Ceres Bus Line
 Chan Transit
 Librando Trans
 Rough Riders
The municipality also has a RORO (Roll-On Roll Off) port situated in Tangil, which serves as the gateway between southern Cebu and mideastern Negros Island. There are two shipping companies effectively offering round-the-clock service.

Education

Dumanjug has 30 schools offering basic education, six secondary schools, two tertiary education institutions, and two school districts: District I (Dumanjug Central) and District II (Bitoon Central). One of the town's prominent schools, the Little Flower School, was established in 1946 as the Dumanjug branch of the Colegio de San Carlos (now University of San Carlos). It was later renamed as the Dumanjug Catholic High School. It is currently administered by the Oblates of Notre Dame. Dumanjug's biggest school, Bitoon National Vocational School, is in the northern barangay of Bitoon. A satellite campus of the Cebu Technological University is also located in Bitoon.

Elementary Schools - Public Schools
Balaygtiki Elementary School 
Bitoon Central Elementary School 
Bulak Elementary School
Bullogan Elementary School 
Calaboon Elementary School 
Cambanog Elementary School 
Camboang Elementary School 
Cogon Elementary School 
Cotcoton Elementary School
Doldol Elementary School
Dumanjug Central Elementary School
Kabalaasnan Elementary School
Kang-actol Elementary School
Kanghalo Primary School
Kanghumaod Elementary School
Kantangkas Elementary School
Kanyuko Primary School
Lamak Primary School
Lawaan Elementary School
Manlapay Elementary School
Masa Elementary School
Matalao Elementary School
Paculob Elementary School
Panlaan Elementary School
Pawa Elementary School
Tangil Elementary School
Tapon Elementary School
Tubod-Bitoon Elementary School
Tubod-Dugoan Elementary School

Elementary Schools - Private School
Little Flower School, Inc.

High Schools - Public Schools
Bitoon NVHS 
Bulak National High School 
Cogon National High School
Dumanjug National High School
Hipolito Boquecosa Memorial National High School
Tubod Dugoan National High School

Universities or Tertiary Schools - Public Schools
Cebu Technological University (CTU)
Bitoon National Vocational School

References

External links
 [ Philippine Standard Geographic Code]

Municipalities of Cebu